Robert Fergusson (1750–1774) was a Scottish poet.

Robert Fergusson may also refer to:

Robert Cutlar Fergusson (1768–1838), Scottish lawyer
Robert Fergusson, 9th Laird of Craigdarroch, see William Cunningham, 6th Earl of Glencairn
 Captain Robert Fergusson, founder of American paint manufacturer Rust-Oleum

See also
Robert Ferguson (disambiguation)